Lili Marie Simmons (born July 23, 1993) is an American actress and model known for her role as Rebecca Bowman in the Cinemax series Banshee (2013–2016).

Early life

Simmons was born and raised in Cardiff-by-the-Sea in San Diego County, California. At age 15, Simmons was discovered by talent manager Kate Linden.

Career
Simmons began her career as a Ford Model, also modelling for Bebe Stores, Roxy, J.C. Penney and Saturn.

She moved into acting in 2010 on the web series Hollywood Is Like High School with Money, based on the book of the same name, playing Quinn Whitaker. She also appeared in an episode of the Disney XD sitcom Zeke and Luther and then in the 2011 Disney Channel Original Movie Geek Charming. Also that year, she had a small role in an episode of the sitcom Mr. Sunshine.

In 2012, Simmons starred in the film Fat Kid Rules the World, and guest starred in an episode of Jane by Design. In 2013, she appeared in an episode of Vegas and began playing Rebecca Bowman, a rebellious Amish girl on the Cinemax series Banshee. She originally auditioned for the role of Deva Hopewell, but: "They said, 'She's too old or too sexy' or whatever". While in Philadelphia for her grandmother's funeral, the producers asked her to go back to New York to read for Rebecca, after which she won the role. In March that year, she appeared in a pictorial in Maxim magazine.

In 2014, Simmons began recurring roles on Hawaii Five-0, and the series True Detective.
In April 2016, she was cast in what had been stated would be a recurring role in another series, Westworld, though she appeared in only one episode during the first season. In February 2017, Simmons was cast in a season-long arc on the fifth season of the Showtime drama series Ray Donovan, playing Natalie James, "the star of a big movie franchise".

In April 2019, it was confirmed by actress Camren Bicondova that Simmons was cast to replace her in the role of the adult Selina Kyle / Catwoman for the series finale of Gotham, at her request to "give the torch to someone else for her adult self", which was respected by the Fox Broadcasting Company, Warner Bros. Television, and the series' producers. Bicondova and Simmons met beforehand and collaborated on the characterization. Showrunner John Stevens described casting Simmons as "a stroke of incredible good fortune", as well as praising her as "an incredible actress and looks like she could be Cam's sister."

Filmography

Film

Television

Web

References

External links
 
 

1993 births
Living people
American film actresses
American television actresses
People from La Jolla, San Diego
Actresses from San Diego
21st-century American actresses